Um Aing-ran (born March 20, 1936) is a South Korean actress. She has starred in about 190 films, and gained a popularity with the image of "a cheerful female college student" in the 1960s. Her marriage with Shin Seong-il, a colleague actor and big star of the time, attracted national attention. Since then she had been retired from the film industry, but returned as a TV show guest and host in the 1990s. The couple have three children.

Filmography 
*Note; the whole list is referenced.

Planner

Awards 
 1963 the 3rd Blue Dragon Film Awards : Favorite Actress
 1964 the 3rd Blue Dragon Film Awards : Favorite Actress
 1965 the 3rd Blue Dragon Film Awards : Best Actress for The Beautiful Eyes (아름다운 눈동자 Areumdaun Nundongja)

References

External links 

1936 births
Living people
20th-century South Korean actresses
South Korean film actresses
South Korean television actresses
Actresses from Seoul
Yeongwol Eom clan
South Korean Buddhists